Daniel McArthur (9 August 1867 – 11 November 1943) was a Scottish footballer who played as a goalkeeper for Celtic, Clyde and Scotland. With Celtic, he won the Scottish Football League title in 1895–96 and 1897–98 and the Scottish Cup in 1899 and 1900.

References

Sources

External links

London Hearts profile (Scotland)
London Hearts profile (Scottish League)

1867 births
1943 deaths
Association football goalkeepers
Scottish footballers
Footballers from Glasgow
Scotland international footballers
Celtic F.C. players
Clyde F.C. players
Parkhead F.C. players
Scottish Junior Football Association players
Scottish Football League players
Scottish Football League representative players